

Squad

First-team squad
As of 1 September 2008.

Transfers

In

Out

Out on loan

Appearances and goals
Last updated on 21 July 2008.

|}

Pre-season

Allsvenskan

Svenska Cupen

References

External links
 Halmstads BK homepage
 SvFF homepage

2007
Halmstad